The Atlanta Open (known for sponsorship reasons as the Truist Atlanta Open), is a professional men's tennis tournament that has been played in the Atlanta area in the United States since 2010, usually during July or August. The tournament is played on outdoor hard courts as part of the USTA's US Open Series, the seven-week summer season lead-up to the U.S. Open.

The event was previously held in Indianapolis from 1988 until it was moved to Atlanta after 2009. The Atlanta Open was known as the Atlanta Tennis Championships for its first two years before signing BB&T as a title sponsor in 2012. In 2015, the tournament was acquired by GF Sports from its then-owners, the USTA.

History
In 2009, the Association of Tennis Professionals purchased the license for the tournament in Indianapolis  because of low ticket sales and a struggle to attract top players. In December 2009 it was announced that the ATP had sold the license to a group in Atlanta, Georgia, where it would be held at the Atlanta Athletic Club. Prior to 2010 Atlanta had previously held a tennis tournament known as the Verizon Tennis Challenge from 1992 to 2001. That tournament, also held at the Atlanta Athletic Club, included Andy Roddick, Pete Sampras, Andre Agassi and John McEnroe among its past champions.

In 2011 the tournament moved to the Racquet Club of the South in suburban Atlanta. In 2012, the tournament gained BB&T as title sponsor and changed its name to the BB&T Atlanta Open. The 2012 and later editions have been held in Atlantic Station in midtown Atlanta. Temporary courts are constructed around the retail and residential area's central park. The main court has a capacity of 4,000 people. In 2015, the tournament was acquired from the USTA by GF Sports.

For its first six years, the Atlanta Open singles was dominated by Americans. Mardy Fish, Andy Roddick, and John Isner were the only men to win the event before Australian Nick Kyrgios defeated Isner in the 2016 final. Isner, a former Georgia Bulldog and local favorite, owns the tournament records for most finals (9) and most titles (6).

Eddie Gonzalez served as Atlanta Open Tournament Director from 2014-2022.

Finals

Singles

Doubles

Records

See also
 Atlanta WCT – men's tournament
 WTA Atlanta – women's tournament
 List of tennis tournaments

References

External links
 Official website
 Twitter
 Facebook
 Instagram

 
Hard court tennis tournaments in the United States
US Open Series
ATP Tour
ATP Tour 250
Indianapolis Tennis Championships
Atlanta Tennis Championships
Recurring sporting events established in 1988
2010 establishments in Georgia